Ken Rosewall defeated the defending champion Arthur Ashe in the final, 6–1, 7–5, 6–3 to win the men's singles tennis title at the 1971 Australian Open. With the win, he became the first man in the Open Era to win a major singles title without dropping a set.

Seeds
All seeds receive a bye into the second round.

  Rod Laver (third round)
  Ken Rosewall (champion)
  Arthur Ashe (finals)
  Tom Okker (semifinals)
  Tony Roche (third round)
  Roy Emerson (quarterfinals)
  John Newcombe (third round)
  Roger Taylor (third round)
  Andrés Gimeno (second round)
  Marty Riessen (quarterfinals)
  Dennis Ralston (third round)
  Cliff Drysdale (quarterfinals)
  Nikola Pilić (second round)
  Fred Stolle (third round)
  Mark Cox (quarterfinals)
  Ismail El Shafei (third round)

Draw

Final eight

Section 1

Section 2

Section 3

Section 4

External links
 Association of Tennis Professionals (ATP) – 1971 Australian Open Men's Singles draw
 1971 Australian Open – Men's draws and results at the International Tennis Federation

Mens singles
Australian Open (tennis) by year – Men's singles